Ali Bani Hashemi (born 5 April 1934) is an Iranian wrestler. He competed in the men's Greco-Roman bantamweight at the 1960 Summer Olympics.

References

External links
 

1934 births
Living people
Iranian male sport wrestlers
Olympic wrestlers of Iran
Wrestlers at the 1960 Summer Olympics
Sportspeople from Tehran